Aggelidis is a surname. Notable people with the surname include:

 Grigorios Aggelidis (born 1965), German banker and politician
 Michael Aggelidis (born 1962), German politician

See also
 Angelidis